The Egg is a 1922 American silent comedy film directed by Gilbert Pratt, produced by Broncho Billy Anderson featuring and starring Stan Laurel.

Cast
 Stan Laurel as Humpty Dumpty
 Drin Moro as The president's daughter
 Colin Kenny as Gerald Stone
 Tom Kennedy as The Boss
 Alfred Hollingsworth as Mr. Stillwell, the president

References

External links

 

1922 films
1922 comedy films
1922 short films
American silent short films
Silent American comedy films
American black-and-white films
Films directed by Gilbert Pratt
American comedy short films
1920s American films